The 1942 Georgia Pre-Flight Skycrackers football team represented the United States Navy pre-flight aviation training school at the University of Georgia during the 1942 college football season. The team compiled a 7–1–1 record and outscored opponents by a total of 183 to 105. The team was ranked No. 3 among the service teams in a poll of 91 sports writers conducted by the Associated Press.

Raymond "Bear" Wolf was the team's head coach.  The roster of the 1942 Georgia Pre-Flight team was made up of stars from colleges and NFL teams around the country. Notable players (with their prior team in parenthesis) included: Frank Filchock (Washington Redskins), Bob Suffridge (Philadelphia Eagles), Ernie Blandin (Tulane), Jim Poole (New York Giants), Spec Sanders,(New York Yanks), Charlie Timmons (Georgia/Clemson), Allie White (Philadelphia Eagles), Darrell Tully (Detroit Lions), Herschel Ramsey (Philadelphia Eagles), Bob Foxx (Tennessee, 1939 SEC Co-Player of the Year), Noble Doss (Texas), Billy Patterson (Pittsburgh Steelers), Al Piasecky (Duke), Ed Hickerson (Alabama), and Bill Kirchem (Tulane).

Two Skycrackers were named to the 1942 All-Navy All-America football team: Jim Poole at left end and Bill Davis at right tackle. In addition,
Gordon English (left end) and Francis Crimmins (left guard) were named to the 1942 All-Navy Preflight Cadet All-America team.

Schedule

References

Georgia Pre-Flight
Georgia Pre-Flight Skycrackers football seasons
Georgia Pre-Flight Skycrackers football